Ihor Khmara (born 18 March 1990) is a Ukrainian male rower. He represented Ukraine together with Stanislav Kovalov at the 2020 Summer Olympics in the lightweight double sculls competition where they finished 9th.

Career
His best performances at the European Championships were in 2012, 2018, 2020 and 2021 when he finished 6th in lightweight double sculls events.

Khmara competes together with Stanislav Kovalov in lightweight double sculls competitions. They won two silver medals at the Summer Universiades in 2013 and 2015 (that year Khmara also won another silver in men's eight). At the 2017 World Championships in Sarasota they were 9th. At the 2018 World Championships in Plovdiv, they finished 10th. At the 2019 World Championships in Ottensheim, they were 20th. 

Khmara also took part in lightweight quadruple sculls competitions. At the 2016 World Championships in Rotterdam, he together with Roman Fedorenko, Serhii Siabro, and Stanislav Kovalov missed medal after finishing 4th behind crews from Germany, France, and Greece.

Khmara managed to qualify together with Stanislav Kovalov for 2020 Summer Olympics after winning European Qualification Regatta in April 2021 in Varese, Italy. They became the first Ukrainian crew to represent Ukraine in this type of boat. In the lightweight double sculls competition they were 4th out of 6 boat in the heat 2 and 1st out of 6 boats in the repechage heat 1. In the semifinal A/B 2 they finished 4th just 1.5 seconds behind the third boat which was the last one to qualify for final. In final B they finished 3rd, thus ranking 9th at the 2020 Summer Olympics.

Personal life
Khmara is married. His hobbies include fishing and cooking.

References

External links

1990 births
Living people
Ukrainian male rowers
Sportspeople from Kyiv
Rowers at the 2020 Summer Olympics
Olympic rowers of Ukraine
Universiade silver medalists for Ukraine
Universiade medalists in rowing
Medalists at the 2013 Summer Universiade
Medalists at the 2015 Summer Universiade
World Rowing Championships medalists for Ukraine
21st-century Ukrainian people